The  Arizona Rattlers season was the 20th season for the franchise in the Arena Football League. The team was coached by Kevin Guy and played their home games at US Airways Center. In the regular season, the Rattlers won a league-record 16 games, having lost only two, to secure home-field advantage throughout the playoffs. They defeated the Spokane Shock in the conference semifinals before beating the Chicago Rush in the conference championship. In ArenaBowl XXIV however, they fell to the Jacksonville Sharks, giving up a game-winning touchdown with no time left on the clock.

Final roster

Standings

Schedule

Regular season
The Rattlers began the season at home against the Jacksonville Sharks on March 12. They visited the Dallas Vigilantes in their final regular season game.

Playoffs

Regular season

Week 1: vs. Jacksonville Sharks

Week 2: vs. Milwaukee Mustangs

Week 3: at Tulsa Talons

Week 4: vs. Orlando Predators

Week 5: BYE

Week 6: at Kansas City Command

Week 7: vs. Utah Blaze

Week 8: at Spokane Shock

Week 9: at San Jose SaberCats

Week 10: vs. Chicago Rush

Week 11: at New Orleans VooDoo

Week 12: vs. Cleveland Gladiators

Week 13: at Utah Blaze

Week 14: vs. Iowa Barnstormers

Week 15: vs. San Jose SaberCats

Week 16: at Philadelphia Soul

Week 17: vs. Spokane Shock

Week 18: at Pittsburgh Power

Week 19: BYE

Week 20: at Dallas Vigilantes

Playoffs

National Conference Semifinals: vs. (4) Spokane Shock

National Conference Championship: vs. (2) Chicago Rush

ArenaBowl XXIV: vs. (A1) Jacksonville Sharks

References

Arizona Rattlers
Arizona Rattlers seasons
2011 in sports in Arizona
2010s in Phoenix, Arizona